The East Borden Important Bird Area comprises a cluster of patches of remnant native vegetation, totalling 459 ha and surrounded by farmland, in the Great Southern region of Western Australia.  It has been identified as an Important Bird Area by BirdLife International because it supports at least 20 breeding pairs of the endangered Carnaby's Cockatoo which nest in tree hollows in the remnant woodland and feed in native shrublands.

References

Great Southern (Western Australia)
Important Bird Areas of Western Australia